Kingsville Academy was a school which was chartered in Kingsville, Ohio in 1834. Its building was constructed in 1836. In its 37-year history, the institution educated about 5,000 students. With the rise of the public high school, enrollment dwindled and, ultimately led to the Academy`s demise and the building burned down in 1927

Notable people
Some of its notable students included:
 John Bidwell
 Daniel Bliss
 Julius C. Burrows
 Adelia Cleopatra Graves (1821-1895), educator, author, poet
 James Robinson Graves
 Stephen A. Northway
 Albion Tourgée

References

High schools in Ashtabula County, Ohio
1834 establishments in Ohio
1927 disestablishments in Ohio